Rudolf Kus (23 February 1915, Zábřeh – 3 July 2006, Bratislava) was a Czechoslovak boxer who competed in the 1936 Summer Olympics.

In 1936 he was eliminated in the second round of the heavyweight class after losing his fight to the upcoming gold medalist Herbert Runge.

References

1915 births
2006 deaths
People from Zábřeh
Czechoslovak male boxers
Heavyweight boxers
Olympic boxers of Czechoslovakia
Boxers at the 1936 Summer Olympics
Slovak male boxers
Sportspeople from the Olomouc Region